Winnipeg North—St. Paul (also known as Winnipeg—St. Paul) was a federal electoral district (or riding) in Manitoba, Canada, that was represented in the House of Commons of Canada from 1997 to 2004.

This riding was created in 1996 as "Winnipeg—St. Paul" from parts of Selkirk—Red River, Winnipeg North and Winnipeg Transcona ridings.

It was renamed "Winnipeg North—St. Paul" in 1997.

It was abolished in 2003 when it was redistributed into Kildonan—St. Paul and Winnipeg North ridings.

Election results

See also
 List of Canadian federal electoral districts
 Past Canadian electoral districts

External links
 
 

Former federal electoral districts of Manitoba
Kildonan, Winnipeg
North End, Winnipeg